The Maxx is an American comic book series created by Sam Kieth in 1993 and originally-published monthly until 1998 by Image Comics for 35 issues, before being collected in trade paperback by DC Comics' Wildstorm imprint. The first appearance of the character was in Darker Image #1 by Image Comics in March 1993. The comic book, starring an eponymous purple-skinned hero, spawned a 13-episode animated series on MTV that originally aired April–June 1995.  Starting in November 2013 and ending in September 2016, the original series has been republished by IDW as The Maxx: Maxximized with new colors and improved scans of the original artwork by Sam Kieth and Jim Sinclair. In 2018, the Maxx featured in a five-issue crossover series with Batman, published by IDW.

The series follows the adventures of the titular hero in two worlds: The real world and an alternate reality referred to as the Outback (presumably named metaphorically after the real Australian outback). In the real world, Maxx is a vagrant, a "homeless man living in a box", while in the Outback, he is the powerful protector of the Jungle-Queen, who exists in the real world as Julie Winters, a freelance social worker who often bails Maxx out of jail. While Maxx is aware of the Outback, Julie is not, though it is integral to both of their stories.

Plot summary

Main story arc
Mr. Gone, a serial rapist with a telepathic link to Julie, has extensive knowledge of and access to other people's Outbacks. He starts phoning Julie, but she thinks he is merely an obscene phone caller and ignores him. Eventually, the Maxx gets in Gone's way by "protecting" Julie. Gone tries to kill him with assistance from the Outback's main predators, the Isz. The Maxx fights him in both the Outback and the real world.

Eventually, Mr. Gone makes Julie see the truth about her past and reveals to her how the Maxx came to be. Gone first met Julie when she was a child as "Uncle Artie", a friend of her father; his tall tales about a visit to Australia helped shape Julie's Outback. As Julie begins healing herself and the Outback, the series starts following Sara, a depressed teenager whose mother sends her to Julie for counseling. Sara is often in conflict with her mother, who disciplines her so she will not grow up to be like her father - Mr. Gone.

Backstory
The backstories of several characters are revealed midway through the series. While in college, Julie picks up a hitch-hiker who beats and rapes her before leaving her to die. To cope, she hides in what is referred to as her "Outback" (a primeval landscape situated entirely in her subconscious, where she has control). In the Outback, she becomes "The Jungle Queen", an all-powerful goddess. She spends so much time dwelling in her Outback that the real world and the Outback gradually become unstable.

One night, she accidentally hits a homeless man with her car. Remembering what happened the last time she stopped to help someone, she covers the unconscious body with trash, but in doing so she unintentionally opens a link to the Outback. After Julie leaves, a lampshade in the trash (which had brushed the Outback) expands over the man's body, becoming a mask that consumes him and links him to Julie.

Second storyline
After the conclusion of the first storyline, the action leaps forward from 1995 (the then-present) to the year 2005. Julie and Dave (the former Maxx) having vanished, the action focuses on Sara (as she now spells her name) and Iago, a giant, murderous banana slug from her Outback. Iago has a list of people to kill, and it turns out that Julie and Sara are both on it. Sara is hounded by a homeless man named Norbert whom she soon realizes is her Maxx. Sara has constant confrontations with Mr. Gone, who is repentant of his past crimes. He is visited by three special agents intent on arresting him, but he turns them into insects. Later, after reading a diary he leaves for her that reveals his tragic origin story, Sara eventually feels sympathy for and a connection to her father. She also begins developing a strange power that she may be inheriting from Mr. Gone.

Julie and Dave return to the story after Julie is attacked by Iago and loses a few fingers. It turns out that Julie abandoned her son, Mark, to keep him safe from Iago. She tries to have Dave tell Mark that she is dead so he will stop seeking her out, but Mark does not believe him. Sara, Dave, Mark, Mr. Gone and Norbert band together to rescue Julie from Iago, who kidnaps her and takes her into Sara's outback. Norbert cuts Iago open, apparently defeating him, but Julie has already escaped.

Mr. Gone soon reveals that time is unraveling for the group, which now includes Glorie, one of Mr. Gone's past victims who now has a friendly relationship with him. Gone returns Dave's Maxx power to him. Sara returns as a being whom different people perceive as a giant Isz, pink fairy, or football. Mark has an odd dream about eccentric kidnappers. Each member of the group begins to disappear from reality to be reborn in another. Before Mr. Gone can disappear, the three agents who previously tried to arrest him and now appear as humanoid beings with insect bug heads, return and kill him, as he expected. Mark is the last to disappear.

In Julie's outback, Mr. Gone is reunited with Sara, who is now a child again. The Maxx considers attacking him, but the Jungle Queen says to leave him be, because even evil deserves a place to rest.

In the new reality, Mr. Gone is a professor and Dave is a janitor at his school. Julie and Mark are still mother and son, but seem to live in better conditions. All the principal characters now lead completely distinct lives, yet retain a small part of their connection to the Outback and to each other.

Spirit animals
One of the dominant concepts of The Maxx is that every human being has a spirit animal, which is linked to the person during a pivotal moment in their life. Julie's spirit animal is a rabbit. When she was very young, Julie rescued a dying rabbit that lay in the road in front of her house (as seen in The Maxx #12). Julie later witnessed her mother bludgeoning the rabbit to death with a shovel to put it out of its misery. This traumatic event linked the rabbit to Julie's subconscious. Julie projects the rabbit onto Dave as she tries to take care of him like the rabbit she was unable to save. Maxx, who is linked to Julie and her spirit animal, worries that, if he removes his mask, he will find the head of a rabbit beneath it.

Sarah's spirit animal is a horse. In the latter half of the series, this spirit animal manifests itself as Norbert, a homeless man she takes pity on.

Isz
The main inhabitants of The Outback, the Isz are small, eyeless beings with egg-shaped bodies, arms and legs, about as large as housecats. The omnivorous white Isz of the Outback become cannibalistic black Isz when brought into the real world. They are stronger, faster, and have sharper teeth than white Isz. However, in one instance, a single White Isz was able to cross over into the real world unchanged when there was a small punctured hole in an alley wall that directly connected both realities. The Black Isz proceeded to torture their less aggressive kin after its initial mission had been completed, showing the completely opposite degrees of aggression the two types exhibit. The Black Isz can assume different appearances depending on the clothes they wear, and their intent. If an Isz is dressed as an elderly woman, it appears as such to anyone who does not know already that it is an Isz. In the latter part of the series, Sara's Isz appear as pink, flying, eyeless fairies that explode if not kept in water.

Collected editions
The original comic series was collected into five trade paperbacks:

The Maxx Book 1: Issues #1–6,  (September 2003)
The Maxx Book 2: Issues #7–13, Darker Image #1 
The Maxx Book 3: Issues #14–20 
The Maxx Book 4: Issues #21–27 
The Maxx Book 5: Issues #28–35 
The spin-off series Friends of Maxx #1–3 (April 1996–March 1997) was collected as:
The Maxx Book 6  (February 2006)

The IDW reissues of the comics have also been collected into hardcover collections:

The Maxx Maxximized Volume 1: Issues #1–4,  (July 2014)
The Maxx Maxximized Volume 2: Issues #5–8, 
The Maxx Maxximized Volume 3: Issues #9–12, 
The Maxx Maxximized Volume 4: Issues #13–18, 
The Maxx Maxximized Volume 5: Issues #19–24, 
The Maxx Maxximized Volume 6: Issues #25–30, 
The Maxx Maxximized Volume 7: Issues #31–35,  (December 2016)
IDW collected the reissues into trade paperbacks:

 The Maxx: Maxxed Out Volume 1: Issues #1–12, 978-1-63140-555-6 (March 2016)
 The Maxx: Maxxed Out Volume 2: Issues #13–24, 978-1-63140-705-5
 The Maxx: Maxxed Out Volume 3: Issues #25–35, 978-1-63140-880-9 (May 2017)

Other issues 
Besides an appearance of the Maxx in Comico Primer #5 (1983), other Maxx issues include an 8-page spread in the first and only issue of Darker Image (March 1993), an incomplete anthology series from Image Comics, as well as The Maxx #½ (June 1993) and a Gen¹³/The Maxx crossover (December 1995). Recently, IDW published another crossover series of five issues, Batman/The Maxx (October 2018–February 2019).

 Batman/The Maxx: The Lost Year Compendium: Issues #1–3 (Kindle Edition) (September 2020)
 Batman/The Maxx: Arkham Dreams: Issues #1–5,   (2021)

Cameos
The Maxx has made cameo appearances in the graphic novel Popbot Book 2 (which Kieth co-wrote), issue #1 of the independent comic Armature, the Sonic the Hedgehog comic Sonic Super Special #7 Sonic/Image Crossover, the four issue limited series Altered Image,  Bloodwulf #2, The Savage Dragon #28 (collected in Savage Dragon Vol. 7: A Talk With God), and Troll Halloween Special #1. He also briefly appears in the series Mars Attacks Image. He appears on a TV screen on the Frostbite version of the cover to DV8 #1. Maxx stories have also appeared in Gay Comics #24 and IDW Publishing's Hero Comics 2014. In 2018, Maxx made a long-awaited comeback with Batman in the Arkham Dreams series.

Television series

The comic book series was adapted into an animated series as part of the MTV program Oddities. The show covered Darker Image #1, The Maxx #1/2, and issues #1–11 of the regular series and depicted the introduction of Julie, the original Maxx, Mr. Gone, and, later on in the series, Sarah. Therefore, the TV show did not go into the same depth (e.g. revealing the origins of all the characters) as the comic series.

The animation frequently changes style: in one scene, characters may be rendered in detail, but in the next, they may be simplified cartoons.  Often, this is done to show a change in perspective. CGI and even live-action film are sometimes integrated or interspersed with the hand-drawn animation. Critics such as Richard Matthes have noted how much of the animation is based directly on panels from the comic.

Home media

In 1996, the complete series was released on VHS with a runtime of approximately 2 hours. In 2009, it became available to stream on MTV.com, though only to U.S. audiences. On December 17, 2009, The Maxx became available on DVD exclusively through Amazon's CreateSpace "Manufacture-on-Demand" program; it contains every episode of the TV show and also includes audio commentary on each episode, plus interviews with creator Sam Kieth and director Gregg Vanzo.

Voice actors
Michael Haley as The Maxx
Glynnis Talken as Julie Winters and Glorie
Amy Danles as Sarah
Barry Stigler as Mr. Gone

Other media

Role-playing game
An adventure for the Heroes & Heroines role-playing game was released using The Maxx characters and setting.

Soundtrack
An audio drama comic adaptation, MAXXimum Sound: A Comic Book Soundtrack, was made from the first three issues of the comic book and released on audio cassette in 1993. It was created by Stephen Romano and managed by Smiles Lewis.

Video game
In 2008, Chris Vick made an Atari Jaguar (1993 console) video game demo based on the Maxx for the JagCode II contest. Being the winner of the contest, it is available on the JagCode II website.

Film
On November 22, 2019, Channing Tatum and Roy Lee announced their intent to produce a film based on The Maxx.

References

External links
 Sam Kieth's Blog
 Official site of The Maxx
 
 TV.com entry for The Maxx
The Maxx at Don Markstein's Toonopedia. Archived from the original on February 15, 2016.

1990s American adult animated television series
1995 American television series debuts
1995 American television series endings
American adult animated drama television series
American adult animated fantasy television series
American adult animated superhero television series
Comics about women
Comics adapted into animated series
Comics adapted into television series
Dark fantasy television series
Feminist comics
Fictional humanoids
Image Comics superheroes
MTV cartoons
Television shows based on comics
Television series based on Image Comics
Television series by Rough Draft Studios